Stephan Rosti (16 November 1891 – 22 May 1964) was an Egyptian actor and film director who lived and worked in Egypt.

Personal
Rosti's mother was an Italian Egyptian dancer. She was performing in Egypt when she met Rosti's father, the Austrian ambassador to Cairo. Rosti's mother was enamoured with Egypt to the point that when it was time for the diplomat father to terminate his political assignment (in Cairo) and return to his country, she refused to travel with him and decided to remain in Egypt with her son. To escape the father's attempts to smuggle the child out of Egypt, she escaped with the child to Alexandria and they lived in the Raas Al-Teen neighborhood where Stephan enrolled in its local schools.

As a young man, Rosti travelled to Austria seeking recognition by his father, but to no avail. As he danced and worked odd jobs in Austria, Germany, and France. Rosti met and befriended two visiting Egyptian film-makers, Mohammed Karim and Sirag Mounir, who encouraged him to return to Egypt to work in cinema, given his fluency in Egyptian Arabic and after he expressed his desire to do so. Rosti returned to Egypt and enrolled as a student in the "Acting Institute" of Cairo, and accepted his first role as director of the first wholly Egyptian feature film, "Layla" from producer Aziza Amir in 1927.

Rosti appeared in 24 Egyptian films between 1927 and 1964. He also directed seven Egyptian films between 1931 and 1946. He was renowned for portraying evil characters with a satirical inclination, and he became an icon of the Egyptian film industry.

Filmography

Actor::
(1920–1964)

Emraa alal hamish (1964)
... a.k.a. A Woman on the Outside (International: English title)
Garima el dahika, El (1964)
... a.k.a. The Funny Crime (International: English title)
Majanin fi naim, El (1963)
... a.k.a. Madmen in Paradise (International: English title)
Nashal, El (1963)
... a.k.a. The Pickpocket (International: English title)
Seraa el gababera (1963)
... a.k.a. Struggle of Giants (International: English title)
Nassab, El (1961)
Sayedat el kasr (1958) .... Shafeek
... a.k.a. Lady of the Castle (International: English title)
Kalb loh ahkam, El (1957) .... Friend
... a.k.a. The Heart Has Its Reasons (International: English title)
Ketar el lail (1953)
... a.k.a. The Night Train (International: English title)
Ma takulshi la hada (1952)
... a.k.a. Don't Tell Anyone (USA: DVD box title)
... a.k.a. Mat'culch le had (USA: DVD box title)
Khadaini abi (1951)
... a.k.a. My Father Deceived Me (International: English title)
Akher kedba (1950) .... The Doctor
... a.k.a. The Last Lie (USA: DVD title)
Ghazal al-banat (1949) .... Cabaret Owner
... a.k.a. The Flirtation of Girls (USA)
Afrita hanem (1949) .... Ishta
... a.k.a. Lady Afrita (International: English title)
Egaza fi gahannam (1949)
... a.k.a. Holidays in Hell (International: English title)
Rajulun la yanam (1949)
... a.k.a. A Sleepless Man (International: English title)
Mughamarat Antar wa Abla (1948)
... a.k.a. The Adventures of Antar and Abla
Bolbol effendi (1946)
... a.k.a. Mr. Nightingale (International: English title)
Ibn El-balad (1942)
... a.k.a. The Urchin (International: English title)
Si Omar (1941)
... a.k.a. Mr. Omar (International: English title)
Salama fi khair (1938)
... a.k.a. Everything Is Fine (International: English title: informal title)
Antar effendi (1936)
... a.k.a. Antar Esquire (International: English title)
Sahib al saada Kishkish beh (1931)
... a.k.a. Lord of the Revels (International: English title)
bahr biyidhak leih, El (1928)
... a.k.a. Why Is the Sea Chuckling? (International: English title)
Laila (1927)

Director: (1930s-1940s)

Gamal wa Dalal (1946)
... a.k.a. Gamal and Dalal (International: English title)
Ahlahum (1945)
... a.k.a. The Fairest One (International: English title)
Ibn El-balad (1942)
... a.k.a. The Urchin (International: English title)
Warsha, El (1941)
Antar effendi (1936)
... a.k.a. Antar Esquire (International: English title)
Unshudat el fuad (1932)
... a.k.a. Song of the Heart (International: English title)
Sahib al saada (1931)
... a.k.a. Lord of the Revels (International: English title)

Writer:
(1930s-1950s)

Qetar el lail (1953) (story)
... a.k.a. The Night Train (International: English title)
Gamal wa Dalal (1946) (writer)
... a.k.a. Gemal and Dalal (International: English title)
Ebn el balad (1943) (story)
... a.k.a. The Urchin (International: English title)
Unshudat el fuad (1932) (writer)
... a.k.a. Song of the Heart (International: English title)

Editorial Department:
Ibn el balad (1943) (montage)
... a.k.a. The Urchin (International: English title)

References

External links
 

1891 births
1964 deaths
Egyptian male film actors
Egyptian film directors
Egyptian people of Italian descent
Egyptian people of Austrian descent